Taiwo Ajai-Lycett , OON (born 3 February 1941) is a Nigerian actress,journalist, television presenter, and cosmetologist. Lycett is a feminist and was the first editor of Africa Woman magazine in the 1970s.

Biography
Lycett was born as the first of a set of twin girls on 3 February 1941 in Lagos, Western Region of Colonial Nigeria, her father was of Awori heritage. She was educated at Mt Carmel Convent School, Lagos, before proceeding to Methodist Girls' High School, Lagos.

To further her studies, she traveled to London to study business and administration. In London, she took courses at Christine Shaw School of Beauty Science in London, where she received a certificate in cosmetology. She also attended Hendon College of Technology, where she obtained a Higher National Diploma in Business Studies in 1969. While studying, she worked as a waitress at Lyons Tea Shop, then moved to the Post Office and later advertising. In the Post Office, she started as a personal secretary in 1962 and later worked as a senior secretary in the office of Lord Hall.

She moved to advertising and was in the personnel department of advertising firm, Young and Rubicam. She then worked as a personal assistant to the managing partner of Gresham Broad and Co, an accounting firm. She first became a mother at the age of 15; this caused her parents and family to ignore her, but she then enrolled herself for evening class. In 1959, She had the opportunity of going to the United Kingdom, through her friend David Akinduro, whom she later married. However, the marriage eventually broke down due to domestic violence. After her divorce with Akinduro, she married Thomas Lycett and their marriage was a long-lasting one. However, in 2006, she was robbed and raped in her house in Egbe at the age of 65. On 3 February 2021, she had her 80th birthday where she received greetings from family and friends from distinguished locations.

Acting career
Her acting debut was in December 1966 in Wole Soyinka's The Lion and the Jewel, a two-act comedy directed by William Gaskill at the Royal Court Theatre in London. Her acting debut was not planned, she was in the rehearsal hall of the play when she was asked by Gaskill to be a participant. After the encouragement she received following her performance and the invitations from producers that followed, she decided to take a career in acting seriously. She enrolled at the Guildhall School of Music and Drama.

In 1972, she left her corporate career and joined the Traverse Theatre Group for the Edinburgh Festival. She was later in a string of television and stage shows. In 1973, she was in Amadu Maddy's play Life Everlasting at the Africa Centre, London, and later in the year, she was in Peter Nichols' The National Health during the Festival of British Theatre. In 1976, she played the lead role in Yemi Ajibade's Parcel Post at the Royal Court Theatre. Together with the actor Louis Mahoney and the writer Mike Phillips, she was a director with the Black Theatre Workshop in London.

She returned to Nigeria in 1971. She has featured in several notable Nigerian films, including Tinsel, the award-winning Nigerian soap opera. Ajai-Lycett also featured in other notable works such as the Nigerian movie Oloibiri. A 2016 action thriller film, Oloibiri was directed by Curtis Graham, produced by Rogers Ofime and starred, in addition to Ajai-Lycett, Olu Jacobs, and Richard Mofe Damijo. The film tells the story on how government agencies, along with oil companies, exploited the newly discovered oil in the historic town of Oloibiri.

Produced by: Rogers Ofime

Directed by: Curtis Graham

Journalism career
In 1975, Ajai-Lycett was invited to join the staff of Africa Magazine published by Raph Uwechue. Later, she became the pioneer editor of Africa Woman magazine, a women's magazine for Africans in the diaspora. As editor, she was a participant at the United Nations International Women's Year.

Awards and honours

On 1 October 2006 she received a national award of Officer of the Order of the Niger, decorated by Chief Olusegun Obasanjo, president of the Federal Republic of Nigeria.
In February 2008, at an All-Star Gala held at Theatre Royal Stratford East on the 10th anniversary of Tiata Fahodzi, she was honoured as a leader of British-African theatre, alongside Dotun Adebayo and Yemi Ajibade.

She is a Fellow of the Society of Nigerian Theatre Artists (SONTA).

She was honored with The Industry Merit Award at the 2022 Africa Magic Viewer's Choice Awards (AMVCA) on the 14th of May 2022. The awards event held at  Eko Hotel in Lagos.

Work

Stage (selected)

Selected filmography
Some Mothers Do 'Ave 'Em (Season 2, Episode 5 - Father's Clinic)
Crown Court (1976)
The Honourable (1992)
Tinsel (TV series)
Dazzling Mirage (2014)
The Inheritors
King of Boys: The Return of the King (2021)
Elesin Oba, The King's Horseman (2022)

See also
Wole Oguntokun

References

External links

 "It is silly to say I won’t remarry–TAIWO AJAI-LYCETT", The Nation, 27 April 2014.

Living people
1941 births
Nigerian film actresses
Yoruba actresses
Actresses from Lagos
20th-century Nigerian actresses
21st-century Nigerian actresses
Nigerian expatriates in the United Kingdom
Nigerian stage actresses
Officers of the Order of the Niger
Methodist Girls' High School alumni
Alumni of the Guildhall School of Music and Drama
Alumni of Middlesex University
Nigerian twins
AMVCA Industry Merit Award winners
Nigerian journalists
Nigerian television presenters
Nigerian television personalities